Slaughter & Apparatus: A Methodical Overture is the fifth album by death metal band Aborted. David Haley from Psycroptic was the featured drummer for the release.

Japanese copies contain the bonus track "Surprise! You're Dead!", which is a cover of Faith No More.

Track listing

Personnel

Aborted
 Sven "Svencho" de Caluwé – vocals
 Sebastien "Seb Purulator" Tuvi – guitars, backing vocals
 Matty Dupont – guitars
 Peter Goemaere – bass
 David Haley – drums

Additional personnel
 Jeffrey Walker (Carcass)
 Jacob Bredahl (Hatesphere)
 Henrik Jacobsen (Hatesphere)

References 

Aborted (band) albums
Century Media Records albums
2007 albums